Foutouri is a department or commune of Komondjari Province in Burkina Faso.

Cities 
The department consists of a chief town :

 Foutouri

and 11 villages:

 Bartiébougou-Fulani
 Bontégou
 Bossongri
 Gourel-Cowpea

 Haaba
 Kienkièga
 Paagou
 Paagou-Fulani

 Penkatougou
 Tambiga
 Tambissonguima.

References 

Departments of Burkina Faso
Komondjari Province